Bellonne is a commune in the Pas-de-Calais department in the Hauts-de-France region in northern France.

Geography
A small village located 12 miles (19 km) east of Arras on the D44 road.

Population

Sights
 The church of St. Martin, rebuilt in the 20th century, along with most of the village.

See also
Communes of the Pas-de-Calais department

References

Communes of Pas-de-Calais